The 1939 Down by-election was a parliamentary by-election held in the United Kingdom on 10 May 1939 for the House of Commons constituency of Down in Northern Ireland.

Previous MP

Previous Result

Candidates

Result 
James Little was elected unopposed as an Ulster Unionist.

Aftermath 
Little subsequently left the party in the run-up to the 1945 general election in a dispute over re-selection and stood as an Independent Unionist.

References
 British Parliamentary Election Results 1918-1949, compiled and edited by F.W.S. Craig (The Macmillan Press 1979)

1939 elections in the United Kingdom
By-elections to the Parliament of the United Kingdom in County Down constituencies
Unopposed by-elections to the Parliament of the United Kingdom (need citation)
20th century in County Down
1939 elections in Northern Ireland